A separator is a centrifugal device that separates milk into cream and skimmed milk. Separation was commonly performed on farms in the past. Most farmers milked a few cows, usually by hand, and separated milk. Some of the skimmed milk was consumed while the rest was used to feed calves and pigs. Enough cream was saved to make butter, and the excess was sold.

Today, milk is separated in industrial dairies. Sufficient cream is returned to the skimmed milk before sale.

History

Before the advent of centrifugal separators, separation was performed by letting milk sit in a container until the cream floated to the top and could be skimmed off by hand. A variant container-separator had a nozzle at the bottom which was opened to allow the milk to drain off. A window in the side, near the nozzle at the bottom, allowed the operator to observe when the milk was drained.

The centrifugal separator was first manufactured by Gustaf de Laval, making it possible to separate cream from milk faster and more easily, without having to let the milk sit for a time, and risk it turning sour. Possibly because Gustaf de Laval manufactured the first cream separators, many people credit the invention to de Laval. However, many patents appear before his, all of them labelled as 'improvements'. One of the first specifically for cream separation was patented by W. C. L. Lefeldt and C. G. O. Lentsch.

The original centrifugal separators were hand-cranked, as illustrated.

Mechanism
Manual rotation of the separator handle turns a worm gear mechanism which causes the separator bowl to spin.

When the separator is spun, the heavier milk is pulled outward against its walls and the cream, which is lighter, collects in the middle. The cream and milk then flow out separate spouts. After separation, the cream and skimmed milk are mixed together in a certain ratio until the favoured fat content has been set. The ratio is dependent upon the product which is to be produced (low-fat milk, full-fat milk or cream). Some floor model separators were built with a swinging platform attached to the stand. The bucket for collecting the cream was put on the platform, and a much larger bucket was set on the floor to collect the milk. Some floor model separators had two swinging platforms. Smaller versions of separators were called table-top models, for small dairies with only a few cows or goats.

Gustaf de Laval's construction made it possible to start the largest separator factory in the world, Alfa Laval AB. The milk separator represented a significant industrial breakthrough in Sweden. Within the first decade of the 1900s, there were over twenty separator manufacturers in Stockholm. Separators in modified form are also used on ships to purify oil, which may have been their original use, because in its original form de Laval proposed the separator for use in his steam turbine. De Laval's turbine used mechanically lubricated journal bearings which weren't insulated from the inside of the turbine. When the steam condensed into water it contaminated the oil. To purify the oil a centrifugal separator was used, which was later adapted to the dairy industry.

The original design had a manual bowl that required manual cleaning.  Most modern separators use a self-ejecting centrifuge bowl that can automatically discharge any sedimentary solids that may be present, thus allowing clean-in-place (CIP).

A distinction is made between warm milk skimming and cold milk skimming:

 Warm milk skimming separator: At first the raw milk is heated and then skimmed warm. There is a significant difference in density between cream and skimmed milk, because of the higher temperature. 
 Cold milk skimming separator: Because of the lower energy, which is used, the production cost will be reduced. Also at cold temperatures, the growth of microorganisms is significantly reduced. In the USA, Mexico, Australia and New Zealand, cold milk skimming is on the rise.

Resources
The North American Dairy Foundation publishes a separator and other dairy antique newsletter three times yearly.

References

Bibliography
Green, Don W.; Perry, Robert H. Perry's Chemical Engineers' Handbook (8th Edition). McGraw-Hill Professional, 2007.

External links

Dairy farming